Screwgun Records is a jazz record label founded by saxophonist Tim Berne in 1996. Most releases on the label have been by Berne, though some have been by Berne's associates and bandmates. Steve Byram has designed and illustrated the artwork for many of the label's albums.

After attending college in Oregon, Berne moved to New York City in the 1970s to meet saxophonist Julius Hemphill, whose music had inspired him to become a jazz musician. Hemphill became his mentor, giving him saxophone lessons and helping him find his way in the music business. Berne founded Empire Records in the late 1970s to issue own albums. He released five albums, and his work was noticed by Giovanni Bonandrini, an Italian producer who issued Berne's next two albums on Soul Note. Berne signed with Columbia Records in the 1980s, then recorded for JMT Records until it shut down in 1995. Then Berne founded Screwgun to get control of his work again. Screwgun albums were initially distinguished by their brown, cardboard covers decorated with the line drawings of Steve Byram. The unorthodox artwork fit Berne's unorthodox music and business tactics.

Discography

See also 
 List of record labels

References

External links
 Official site

American independent record labels
Vanity record labels
Jazz record labels